Phillips Petroleum Co. v. Wisconsin, 347 U.S. 672 (1954), was a case decided by the Supreme Court of the United States holding that sale of natural gas at the wellhead was subject to regulation under the Natural Gas Act. Prior to this case, independent producers sold natural gas to interstate pipelines at unregulated prices with any subsequent sales for resale being regulated. The State of Wisconsin sought to close this regulatory loophole in order to keep consumer prices low.  Natural gas producers argued that wellhead sales were exempt from federal regulation as "production and gathering." Below, the Federal Power Commission compiled an evidentiary record 10,000 pages long before deciding not to regulate wellhead sales. However, the courts reversed, and the case resulted in federal price controls on wellhead gas prices for the next 40 years.

Background
Natural gas is typically produced in association with oil from wells.  Wells can also be drilled into geological formations that have mostly gas and very little oil.  In the infancy of the oil industry, any natural gas produced from oil wells was burned off. Later, states passed  conservation laws which required the gas to be captured and transported in pipelines for useful purposes.  In order to prevent any gaps in the natural gas regulation when natural gas flows in interstate commerce, Congress enacted the Natural Gas Act of 1938.  That law required that companies must obtain from the Federal Power Commission (FPC) a "certificate of public convenience and necessity" (certificate) before making any sale for resale natural gas in interstate commerce. The FPC set the maximum prices charged for gas sold under a certificate. For example, if gas flowed from a well in Texas through a pipeline to New York where it was sold to a gas distribution company, the sale by the pipeline to the distributor would need a certificate.  The final sale to retail customers were exempt from the law.  Although the Natural Gas Act regulated both the transportation and sale of gas in interstate commerce, the "production and gathering" of gas was exempt from federal regulation, although potentially subject to state control.  Production means bringing the gas out of the ground to a pipe at the top of the wellhead.  Gathering refers to the flow of gas through low pressure lines to the center of a gas field where the gas is treated and compressed to bring it up to the high pressures used in long-distance pipelines.

Oil companies claimed that because production and gathering was exempt, any sales between the oil company that owned the well and the pipeline company were also exempt from Natural Gas Act regulation if they took place at the wellhead or along the gathering lines.  The producers wanted to charge a wellhead price based on market forces, while consumer groups argued that the Natural Gas Act intended that both producers and pipelines should be limited to cost-based rate regulation, so that the final price paid by consumers would represent only the cost of producing, transporting and distributing the gas, instead of a price based on the cost of competing fuels, such as fuel oil.

From 1938 to 1954, the FPC did not regulate wellhead prices.  However, these prices were very low because the amount of available gas supply exceeded the pipeline capacity to move it to national markets. However, after World War II, wellhead gas prices rose even to the point that producers started to drill new gas-only wells in areas that contained little oil.  The State of Wisconsin claimed that the absence of federal wellhead price regulation caused the delivered price of gas in Wisconsin to reach unreasonable levels. Wisconsin wanted the FPC to regulate wellhead gas sales.

Proceedings below
The FPC was a five-member regulatory body appointed by the President and confirmed by the Senate. One of the FPC's strongest leaders was Leland Olds. Olds' insistence on enforcing the Natural Gas Act of 1938 raised the ire of the oil industry in Texas and led to the end of his tenure at the FPC. Robert Caro's book Master of the Senate describes how Lyndon B. Johnson defeated Leland's re-appointment by orchestrating a McCarthyism-style smear campaign. The tactics involved having the staff of the House Un-American Activities Committee dig up old writings, which were then taken out of context to falsely paint Olds as a communist. The subcommittee in charge of reappointment was stacked against Leland and coached by Johnson.  Following such episodes, the FPC was reluctant to impose price regulation on the producers.

Phillips Petroleum Company (now ConocoPhillips) was a very large operator in the petroleum industry and a very large producer, gatherer, and processor of natural gas from wells in Texas, Oklahoma, and New Mexico. Phillips owned and operated nine gathering systems and gas processing plants that sold gas to interstate pipelines at unregulated prices.  The State of Wisconsin represented the interest of consumers who purchases gas from the pipelines that in turn purchased the gas from Phillips. Wisconsin wanted the FPC to regulate Phillips' sale prices. Wisconsin argued that the "production and gathering" exemption applied to the physical movement of gas and not to any sales of gas.

On October 28, 1948, while Olds was still chair, the FPC started an investigation into Phillips' jurisdictional status and whether its rates were unjust and unreasonable. The FPC heard testimony and read exhibits filling close to 10,000 pages of the case record. Gas producing states told the FPC that FPC regulation wellhead sales would interfere with state conservation rules and regulations. After Olds left the Commission, the FPC held that although the sale by Phillips to the pipelines was a "sale for resale in interstate commerce," it was exempt under the "production and gathering" exception. Wisconsin appealed FPC's refusal to regulate to the United States Court of Appeals for the District of Columbia Circuit. Circuit Judges Edgerton, Clark, and Prettyman heard the appeal, and Edgerton wrote the opinion, Wisconsin v. FPC 205 F.2d 706 (D.C. Cir. 1953), which reversed the FPC and held that the "production and gathering" phrase did not include sales.  Circuit Judge Clark wrote a dissent which agreed with Phillips, because Clark saw production and gathering as subject to regulation by the state where the well was located.  Hence, Clark argued that federal regulation of producers is unnecessary. Clark also argued that the reviewing courts should defer to the FPC's interpretation of the statute.

Supreme Court
The court heard argument on April 6–7, 1954. Justice Sherman Minton noted that in Federal Power Commission v. Panhandle Eastern Pipe Line Co., 337 U.S. 498, 337 U.S. 505, the Supreme Court wrote that the "natural and clear meaning" of the phrase "production or gathering of natural gas" is that it encompasses "the producing properties and gathering facilities of a natural gas company." The court read the exemption as not applying to gas sales. Minton's opinion noted, "the legislative history indicates a congressional intent to give the Commission jurisdiction over the rates of all wholesales of natural gas in interstate commerce, whether by a pipeline company or not and whether occurring before, during, or after transmission by an interstate pipeline company. There can be no dispute that the overriding congressional purpose was to plug the 'gap' in regulation of natural gas companies...." Minton justified asserting jurisdiction over wellhead sales because, "Protection of consumers against exploitation at the hands of natural gas companies was the primary aim of the Natural Gas Act." Further, Minton noted that Congress had failed to pass bills that proposed to amend the law to clearly exempt wellhead sales.

Justice Felix Frankfurter concurred with the court's decision.  He noted that the purpose of the Natural Gas Act was to occupy the gap in state regulation caused by the earlier Supreme Court cases which held that states could not regulate interstate gas or electric transactions.  Because states could not regulate sales for resale on gathering lines, Frankfurter argued that Congress intended the FPC to regulate such sales.

Justice William O. Douglas dissented.  He noted that Congress had the power to subject sales by "independent producers" to federal regulation, but that it drafted the Natural Gas Act in a way that chose not to regulate them. He noted, "Whether it did so by the Natural Gas Act of 1938 is a political and legal controversy that has raged in the Commission and in the Congress for some years. The question is not free from doubts."  Justice Douglas predicted that it would be difficult to develop a cost-based rate for gas sold by independent producers.

Justice Tom C. Clark dissented along with Justice Burton. Clark wrote, "The natural gas industry, like ancient Gaul, is divided into three parts. These parts are production and gathering, interstate transmission by pipeline, and distribution to consumers by local distribution companies." Justice Clark believed that  "federal regulation of [producer] sales means an inevitable clash with a complex of state regulatory action, including minimum pricing." So Clark recognized that producing states were actively regulating producers with the objective of keeping prices high and the quantity of gas production uniform, which may conflict with federal and consuming states regulators that sought to keep prices low and the quantity of gas abundant.

Aftermath
As a result of the Supreme Court decision, the FPC suddenly had to issue certificates for each interstate producer and to set cost-based prices for such sales.  This resulted in a huge regulatory back log.  The FPC's regulation of producers was so backlogged that when President-elect John F. Kennedy appointed  James M. Landis, Dean of the Harvard Law School, to provide a transition team report in 1960, Landis declared it to be "the outstanding example in the federal government of the breakdown of the administrative process."  The FPC dropped well-by-well regulation for setting wellhead prices on an area-wide basis on September 28, 1960. Later the FPC adopted a nationwide approach for setting wellhead ceiling prices.

Despite the regulatory delays, the decision resulted in lower natural gas prices for consumers particularly during the times of rapid oil price increases during the 1973 Arab oil embargo.  However, with interstate gas prices kept low under FPC regulation, an alternative network of intrastate pipelines developed in gas producing states offering higher gas prices. Producers sought to sell gas into the intrastate markets whenever possible, resulting in natural gas shortages in the interstate market. Finally, Congress in the Natural Gas Policy Act of 1978 established a substitute set of wellhead prices set by statute and merged the interstate and intrastate gas markets.  Ultimately, Congress deregulated all wellhead natural gas prices effective January 1, 1993, with the Natural Gas Wellhead Decontrol Act (NGWDA) of 1989.

See also
List of United States Supreme Court cases, volume 347

Notes

References

External links
 

1954 in United States case law
United States energy case law
United States Supreme Court cases
United States Supreme Court cases of the Warren Court